Dunner is a surname. Notable people with the surname include:

 Aba Dunner (1937–2011), British Jewish social activist
 David L. Dunner (born 1940), American psychiatrist
 Josef Hirsch Dunner (1913–2007), German-born English orthodox rabbi
 Joseph Hirsch Dünner (1833–1911), Austrian-born Dutch orthodox rabbi
 Leslie Dunner (born 1956), American conductor and composer
 Pini Dunner (born 1970), British-born American orthodox rabbi

See also
 Dunn (surname)
 Duner